Northeast Market was established in 1885 in Middle East, East  Baltimore, United States alongside the development of the area around Johns Hopkins Hospital. The market has gone through several iterations in its history, having been enlarged in 1896, replaced from a wood to brick structure in 1955, renovated again in the 1980s, and most recently updated in 2013.

See also
 Baltimore Public Markets

References

Buildings and structures in Baltimore
Middle East, Baltimore
Food markets in the United States

Market halls
Food retailers